Julian Y. Pottage (born 1962) is a British contract bridge player, writer, and teacher, who studied mathematics at Trinity College, Cambridge. He is also well known as a collector of bridge problems, and writes a monthly problem column in Britain's Bridge Magazine. He has written or co-authored 26 books on bridge, including Bridge Problems for a New Millennium and The Extra Edge In Play with Terence Reese (1913–1996). He also co-edited the recent second edition of Clyde E. Love's Bridge Squeezes Complete. His book Play or Defend? won the International Bridge Press Association's 2004 Book of the Year Award. Pottage is from Basingstoke.

As a player, Pottage has participated in several national and international events, notably winning the Pachabo and Tollemache double in 1999. He lives in Wales.

Bibliography

References

External links
 
 

Living people
1962 births
People from Basingstoke
Contract bridge writers
British and Irish contract bridge players
Welsh contract bridge players
Alumni of Trinity College, Cambridge
Date of birth missing (living people)
Place of birth missing (living people)